A monokine is a type of cytokine produced primarily by monocytes and macrophages.

Some monokines are:
 interleukin 1
 tumor necrosis factor-alpha
 alpha and beta interferon
 colony stimulating factors

Functions
Monokines released from macrophages can attract neutrophils, via the process chemotaxis.

See also
 Lymphokine

References

External links

Cytokines